Middleton is a village and civil parish in North Northamptonshire close to the county boundary with Leicestershire. At the time of the 2001 census, the parish's population was 328 people, increasing to 414 at the 2011 Census.

The villages name means 'middle farm/settlement'.

Geography
Middleton is just to the west of the town of Corby, with Cottingham and East Carlton nearby. There is a very steep hill known locally simply as "The Hill". The village has a Leicestershire postcode.

Amenities
There is a pub with a restaurant -  The Red Lion, Willow Cottage B & B and the Jurassic Way waymarked long-distance footpath passes through the village.

References

External links

Photos of Middleton, Northants and surrounding area on geograph

Villages in Northamptonshire
Civil parishes in Northamptonshire
North Northamptonshire